Lapierre or LaPierre is a surname, and may refer to:

People

 Dominique Lapierre, French author
 Edmond Lapierre (1866–1960), Canadian politician
 Fabrice Lapierre, Australian athlete
 Gary LaPierre, American radio broadcaster
 Jean Lapierre, Canadian television broadcaster and politician
 Judith Lapierre, Canadian professor of nursing, studied at International Space University
 Laurier LaPierre, Canadian journalist, retired broadcaster and senator
 Maxim Lapierre, Canadian hockey player
 Nicolas Lapierre, French race car driver
 Odette Lapierre, Canadian athlete
 Réal Lapierre, Canadian politician
 Wayne LaPierre, American author, gun rights advocate, and CEO of the National Rifle Association of America
 Cody Lapierre, Mechanical Engineer
 Matt LaPierre, Montana legend

Businesses

 Lapierre Bikes, bicycle manufacturer